The 1843 East Suffolk by-election was held on 18 April 1843 after the death of the incumbent Conservative MP Charles Broke Vere. It was retained by the Conservative candidate Frederick Thellusson. The Whig candidate had already stood in 1841.

References

East
1843 in England
1843 elections in the United Kingdom